Difference feminism holds that there are differences between men and women but that no value judgment can be placed upon them and both sexes have equal moral status as persons.

The term "difference feminism" developed during the "equality-versus-difference debate" in American feminism in the 1980s and 1990s, but subsequently fell out of favor and use. In the 1990s, feminists addressed the binary logic of "difference" versus "equality" and moved on from it, notably with postmodern and/or deconstructionist approaches that either dismantled or did not depend on that dichotomy.

Difference feminism did not require a commitment to essentialism. Most strains of difference feminism did not argue that there was a biological, inherent, ahistorical, or otherwise "essential" link between womanhood and traditionally feminine values, habits of mind (often called "ways of knowing"), or personality traits. These feminists simply sought to recognize that, in the present, women and men are significantly different and to explore the devalued "feminine" characteristics. This variety of difference feminism is also called gender feminism.

Some strains of difference feminism, for example Mary Daly's, argue not just that women and men were different, and had different values or different ways of knowing, but that women and their values were superior to men's. This viewpoint does not require essentialism, although there is ongoing debate about whether Daly's feminism is essentialist.

History 
Difference feminism was developed by feminists in the 1980s, in part as a reaction to popular liberal feminism (also known as "equality feminism"), which emphasized the similarities between women and men in order to argue for equal treatment for women. Difference feminism, although it still aimed at equality between men and women, emphasized the differences between men and women and argued that identicality or sameness are not necessary in order for men and women, and masculine and feminine values, to be treated equally. Liberal feminism aimed to make society and law gender-neutral, since it saw recognition of gender difference as a barrier to rights and participation within liberal democracy, while difference feminism held that gender-neutrality harmed women "whether by impelling them to imitate men, by depriving society of their distinctive contributions, or by letting them participate in society only on terms that favor men".

Difference feminism drew on earlier nineteenth-century strains of thought, for example the work of German writer Elise Oelsner, which held that not only should women be allowed into formerly male-only spheres and institutions (e.g. public life, science) but that those institutions should also be expected to change in a way that recognizes the value of traditionally devalued feminine ethics (like care [see ethics of care]). On the latter point, many feminists have re-read the phrase "difference feminism" in a way that asks "what difference does feminism make?" (e.g. to the practice of science) rather than "what differences are there between men and women"?

Essentialism and difference feminism
Some have argued that the thought of certain prominent second-wave feminists, like psychologist Carol Gilligan and radical feminist theologian Mary Daly, is "essentialist". In philosophy essentialism is the belief that "(at least some) objects have (at least some) essential properties". In the case of sexual politics essentialism is taken to mean that "women" and "men" have fixed essences or essential properties (e.g. behavioral or personality traits) that cannot be changed. However, essentialist interpretations of Daly and Gilligan have been questioned by some feminist scholars, who argue that charges of "essentialism" are often used more as terms of abuse than as theoretical critiques based on evidence, and do not accurately reflect Gilligan or Daly's views.

See also 
Cultural feminism
Equality feminism
Ethics of care
Individualist feminism
New feminism

References 

Feminist theory
Feminism and spirituality
Feminist movements and ideologies
Comparisons